Ritchie Duffie (born August 11, 1992) is an American soccer player.

Career 
Dufffie played four years of college soccer, one year at North Carolina Wesleyan College in 2011, before moving to Virginia Commonwealth University in 2012.

While at college, Duffie also appeared for Premier Development League sides Virginia Beach Piranhas and Seattle Sounders FC U-23, as well as National Premier Soccer League side Chesterfield United FC.

Following his senior season, Duffie appeared for NPSL side Fredericksburg FC.

Duffie signed with United Soccer League side Pittsburgh Riverhounds in November 2016, following a successful trial. On November 30, 2017, the Riverhounds declined the option on Duffie's contract, after he appeared in just 10 USL games for the club.

Personal 
Duffie is the brother of Jacksonville Armada FC soccer player Devon Fisher.

References

External links 
 

1992 births
Living people
American soccer players
Association football defenders
VCU Rams men's soccer players
Virginia Beach Piranhas players
Seattle Sounders FC U-23 players
Pittsburgh Riverhounds SC players
Lionsbridge FC players
USL League Two players
USL Championship players
Soccer players from Virginia Beach